Hutki shira, Hukoin Shira, Fukoin Shira, Shukoin shira, or shutki shira (shira, shuru or jol) (depending on different towns) is a fermented fish curry made with seasonal vegetables, leafy greens, and fish or prawns. It is cooked without oil or fat. The dish is famous in the Sylhet region of Bangladesh and it has many variations.

Etymology 
Fermented fish is called hutki in Sylheti, Futki and Fukoin in Jogonathpur (Sylhet), Hukoin in Beanibazar and Golapgong (Sylhet) and Shukoin or shutki in Bengali, while shira means broth. Thus, hutki or variants shira, shuru or jol means the broth of fermented fish.

Variations 
Hutki shirá varies with the availability of seasonal vegetables such as gourd leaves, radishes, and eddoe.

The hidol fish hidoil mas or hidol mas is used traditionally, but lotia fish may be substituted if hidol is unavailable.

A regional variation is the Bengali recipe mukhir hutki shira, which uses eddoe or commonly knows as hairy potato (known in Bengali as mukhi or muki).

Preparation 
Hutki shirá is typically made with hidol hutki, crushed garlic, pureed onion, potatoes, spinach, aubergine, red pepper, chili powder, salt, turmeric, and other seasonal vegetables that are available. The fermented fish is first soaked in cold water, then placed in a large sauce pan or cooking pot with sliced onions, garlic, ground spices, salt, and shrimp. The mixture is then covered and left to cook over a high flame. Next, it is stirred as it continues to cook before pumpkin and aubergine are added. Sufficient water is added to form a broth. In the final step, Naga chili is added and the broth is given a gentle stir. The dish is often eaten over cooked rice.

References 

Sylheti cuisine
Curry dishes
Fermented fish